Julie Houmann (born 22 November 1979) is a Danish badminton player and also plays for the Skovshoved Badminton originally comes from Bornholm. Her best achievements is to win the silver medal at the 2012 European Championships, and won the 2012 Bitburger Open.

Achievements

European Championships 
Mixed doubles

BWF Grand Prix 
The BWF Grand Prix has two levels, the BWF Grand Prix and Grand Prix Gold. It is a series of badminton tournaments sanctioned by the Badminton World Federation (BWF) since 2007.

Mixed doubles

  BWF Grand Prix Gold tournament
  BWF Grand Prix tournament

BWF International Challenge/Series 
Women's doubles

Mixed doubles

  BWF International Challenge tournament
  BWF International Series tournament

References

External links 
 

Danish female badminton players
Living people
1979 births
People from Bornholm
Sportspeople from the Capital Region of Denmark